Face of Collapse is the second and final studio album by Dazzling Killmen, released on March 14, 1994 through Skin Graft Records. Since its initial release, the album has been noted by reviewers to of help influence the development of genres such as math rock, math metal, and post-metal with its utilization of song structures typically associated with jazz and progressive music.

To commemorate the 25th anniversary of Skin Graft Records, a deluxe remastered edition of the album was released on November 11, 2016 as a double LP set. This edition included a book detailing the band's history as well as remastered bonus tracks pulled from the "Medicine Me" 7-inch.

Track listing

Personnel 
Dazzling Killmen
Blake Fleming – drums, remastering
Tim Garrigan – guitar
Darin Gray – bass guitar
Nick Sakes – guitar, vocals

Production and additional personnel
Steve Albini – production
Todd Harris – photography
Paul Nitsche – art direction, design
Mark Fisher - design
Paul Nitsche - design
Andres Balins - remastering
Jason McEntire - remastering

References

External links 
 
 Face of Collapse on Bandcamp
 Face of Collapse: Special Edition on Bandcamp

1994 albums
Albums produced by Steve Albini
Dazzling Killmen albums
Skin Graft Records albums